Calothorax is a genus of birds in the hummingbird family Trochilidae.

Taxonomy
The genus Calothorax was introduced in 1840 by the English zoologist George Robert Gray with the lucifer sheartail as the type species. The name combines the Ancient Greek kalos meaning "beautiful" with thōrax meaning "breast".

The genus contains two species:

References 

 
Hummingbirds
Bird genera
Taxa named by George Robert Gray
Taxonomy articles created by Polbot